This page provides supplementary data about the noble gases, which were excluded from the main article to conserve space and preserve focus. Oganesson mostly not included due to the amount of research known about it.

Physical properties

Solid

Liquid

Gas

Phase changes and critical properties

Atomic properties

Abundance

Economic data

Radon is available only in very small quantities, and due to its short half-life, is generally produced by a radium-226 source in secular equilibrium. Oganesson is almost impossible to produce and with a very short half life, it is generally not readily available for purchase.

References and notes

Chemical element data pages